David Backes (born May 14, 1957 in Milwaukee, Wisconsin) is an American author and professor, best known for writing a biography of Sigurd F. Olson. The book, entitled A Wilderness Within: The Life of Sigurd F. Olson, won the Small Press Book Award for 1998, and received a positive review in The New York Times.

Backes was a professor in the Journalism, Advertising, and Media Studies department of the University of Wisconsin–Milwaukee until his retirement in 2015.

Works
 Spirit of the North: The Quotable Sigurd F. Olson
 The Meaning of Wilderness: Essential Articles and Speeches of Sigurd F. Olson.
 Canoe Country: An Embattled Wilderness
 The Wilderness Companion
 A Wilderness Within: The Life of Sigurd F. Olson

References

External links
 University bio
 Sigurd F. Olson website (maintained by Backes)
 Interview with David Backes at Listening Point about his Sigurd Olson biography (Part One), NORTHERN LIGHTS Minnesota Author Interview TV Series #437 (1999)
 Interview with David Backes at Listening Point about his Sigurd Olson biography (Part Two), NORTHERN LIGHTS Minnesota Author Interview TV Series #438 (1999)

1957 births
Living people
Writers from Milwaukee
University of Wisconsin–Milwaukee faculty